Moyale Barracks Football Club is a Malawian professional football club based in Mzuzu, currently playing in the TNM Super League, the top division of Malawian football.

The club is a military outfit named after Moyale Barracks of the MDF. Moyale is a place and barracks in Kenya where Malawi Soldiers used as a transit camp during World War II. The Nickname "Lions of Kaning'ina" represent the following:
Lions is nickname for soldiers in the country in general while KANING'INA is the name of the forest where Moyale Barracks was established immediate east of Mzuzu City South of Lunyangwa Valley along M5 Mzuzu - Nkhatabay road approximately 3 km from CBD. The word Kaning'ina is a short form of originally Kaning'iniya Vuwa, one of the local languages that means a place with fog and heavy rains throughout the year with patches of little sun, a true summary of its actual weather presently. The club has a strong management structure that includes Board of Trustees (very Senior citizens), an Executive Committee (elected on 2 year tenure), a Technical panel and Supporters Committee (elected from across the northern region.

Ground

Moyale Barracks plays its home matches on Mzuzu Stadium, located in Mzuzu, Northern Region, with a capacity of 15,000 people.

Honours
Super League of Malawi: 
 Runners-up (2): 2013, 2014

Malawi FAM Cup
 Winners (2): 2008, 2010
 Runners-up (2): 2011, 2017

Malawi Carlsberg Cup
 Winners (1): 2001
 Runners-up (1): 2013

BP Top 8 Cup
 Runners-up (1): 2003

Chibuku Cup
 Winners (1): 1999

References

External links
Club profile - Soccerway.com  

Football clubs in Malawi
Military association football clubs in Malawi